Fawzi Fayez Subait Khalifa Alalawi (born 14 July 1987) is an Emirati footballer who plays for Al Urooba as a right back.

He played 3 times at 2010 AFC Champions League.

External links

  Fawzi Statistics At Goalzz.com

1987 births
Living people
Emirati footballers
United Arab Emirates international footballers
Al Ain FC players
Sharjah FC players
Khor Fakkan Sports Club players
Al Urooba Club players
UAE Pro League players
Association football fullbacks